Pierre Brunet may refer to:

 Pierre Brunet (figure skater) (1902–1991), French figure skater
 Pierre Brunet (musician), French 17th century mandola player and teacher
 Pierre Brunet (rowing) (1908–1979), French rowing coxswain
 Pierre Gustave Brunet (1805–1896), French bibliographer
 Pierre Nicolas Brunet (1733–1771), French writer and playwright